The following is a summary of the electoral vote changes between United States presidential elections. It summarizes the changes in the Electoral College vote by comparing United States presidential election results for a given year with those from the immediate preceding election. It tracks those states which changed their support between parties as well as changes resulting from other factors, such as reapportionment.

1792 vs. 1788

Electoral votes of the party that won in 1792: None

* Washington received only 10 of Virginia's 12 electoral votes in the 1788 election.

1796 vs. 1792

Electoral votes of the party that won in 1796: Federalist Party

Though George Washington was officially non-partisan during his presidency, he was broadly sympathetic to the Federalist platform and was endorsed by both parties.
* Washington received only 3 of Vermont's 4 electoral votes in the 1792 election.
† Adams received only 1 of North Carolina's 12 electoral votes in the 1796 election.
‡ Washington only received 8 of Maryland's 10 electoral votes in the 1792 election. In 1796, Adams received 7 of 10.
↑ Adams received only 1 of Pennsylvania's 15 electoral votes in the 1796 election.
↓ Adams received only 1 of Virginia's 21 electoral votes in the 1796 election.

1800 vs. 1796

Electoral votes of the party that won in 1800: Democratic-Republican Party

* Jefferson received only 4 of Maryland's 10 electoral votes in the 1796 election. In 1800, he received 5 of 10.
† Jefferson received only 20 of Virginia's 21 electoral votes in the 1796 election.
‡ Jefferson received only 8 of North Carolina's 12 electoral votes in the 1800 election, as opposed to the 11 of 12 he received in 1796.
↑ Jefferson received only 8 of Pennsylvania's 15 electoral votes in the 1800 election, as opposed to the 14 of 15 he received in 1796.

1804 vs. 1800

Electoral votes of the party that won in 1804: Democratic-Republican Party

* Jefferson received only 5 of Maryland's 10 electoral votes in the 1800 election. In 1804, he received 9 of 11.
† Jefferson received only 8 of North Carolina's 12 electoral votes in the 1800 election.
‡ Jefferson received only 8 of Pennsylvania's 15 electoral votes in the 1800 election.

1808 vs. 1804

Electoral votes of the party that won in 1808: Democratic-Republican Party

* Madison received only 7 of Kentucky's 8 electoral votes in the 1808 election.
† Madison received only 13 of New York's 19 electoral votes in the 1808 election. 
‡ Madison received only 11 of North Carolina's 14 electoral votes in the 1808 election.

1812 vs. 1808

Electoral votes of the party that won in 1812: Democratic-Republican Party

* Madison received only 7 of Kentucky's 8 electoral votes in the 1808 election.
† Madison received only 11 of North Carolina's 14 electoral votes in the 1808 election.
‡ Madison received only 9 of Maryland's 11 electoral votes in the 1808 election. In 1812, Madison received 6 out of 11.
↑ Madison received only 7 of Ohio's 8 electoral votes in the 1812 election.

1816 vs. 1812

Electoral votes of the party that won in 1816: Democratic-Republican Party

* Madison received only 6 of Maryland's 11 electoral votes in the 1812 election. In 1816, Monroe received 8 out of 11
† Madison received only 7 of Ohio's 8 electoral votes in the 1812 election.

1820 vs. 1816

Electoral votes of the party that won in 1820: Democratic-Republican Party

* Monroe received only 7 of New Hampshire's 8 electoral votes in 1820.

1824 vs. 1820

Electoral votes of the candidate that won in 1824: one of several from the Democratic-Republican Party

Due to multiple candidates from the same party in the 1824 election (and the party being the only major party at the time), this chart only shows the electoral votes of the winning candidate, even though he did not receive a plurality of the electoral votes and the election was decided in the United States House of Representatives.
* Adams received only 1 of Delaware's 3 electoral votes in the 1824 election.
† Adams received only 1 of Illinois's 3 electoral votes in the 1824 election.
‡ Adams received only 2 of Louisiana's 5 electoral votes in the 1824 election.
↑ Adams received only 3 of Maryland's 11 electoral votes in the 1824 election.
↓ Adams received only 1 of New Hampshire's 8 electoral votes in 1820 and all 8 in 1824.
# Adams received only 26 of New York's 36 electoral votes in the 1824 election.

1828 vs. 1824

Electoral votes of the candidate that won in 1828: candidate of the Democratic Party in 1828 and one of several from the Democratic-Republican Party in 1824

Due to multiple candidates from the same party in the 1824 election (and the party being the only major party at the time), this chart only shows the electoral votes changes of the winning candidate of 1828.
* Jackson received only 2 of Illinois's 3 electoral votes in the 1824 election.
† Jackson received only 3 of Louisiana's 5 electoral votes in the 1824 election.
‡ Jackson received only 1 of Maine's 9 electoral votes in the 1828 election.
↑ Jackson received 1 of New York's 36 electoral votes in 1824 and 20 of 26 in 1828.
↓ Jackson received 7 of Maryland's 11 electoral votes in 1824 and 5 of 11 in 1828.

1832 vs. 1828

Electoral votes of the party that won in 1832: Democratic Party

* Jackson received 1 of Maine's 9 electoral votes in 1828 and all 10 in 1832.
† Jackson received 20 of New York's 36 electoral votes in 1828 and all 42 in 1832.
‡ Jackson received 5 of Maryland's 11 electoral votes in 1828 and 3 of 11 in 1832.

1836 vs. 1832

Electoral votes of the party that won in 1836: Democratic Party

* Jackson received only 3 of Maryland's 8 electoral votes in the 1832 election.

1840 vs. 1836

Electoral votes of the party that won in 1840: Whig Party

1844 vs. 1840

Electoral votes of the party that won in 1844: Democratic Party

1848 vs. 1844

Electoral votes of the party that won in 1848: Whig Party

1852 vs. 1848

Electoral votes of the party that won in 1852: Democratic Party

1856 vs. 1852

Electoral votes of the party that won in 1856: Democratic Party

1860 vs. 1856

Electoral votes of the party that won in 1860: Republican Party

* Lincoln received only 4 of New Jersey's 7 electoral votes in the 1860 election.

1864 vs. 1860

Electoral votes of the party that won in 1864: Republican Party

* Lincoln received only 4 of New Jersey's 7 electoral votes in 1860.

1868 vs. 1864

Electoral votes of the party that won in 1868: Republican Party

* Lincoln received only 2 of Nevada's 3 electoral votes in 1864.

1872 vs. 1868

Electoral votes of the party that won in 1872: Republican Party

1876 vs. 1872

Electoral votes of the party that won in 1876: Republican Party

1880 vs. 1876

Electoral votes of the party that won in 1880: Republican Party

* Garfield received only 1 of California's 6 electoral votes in the 1880 election.

1884 vs. 1880

Electoral votes of the party that won in 1884: Democratic Party

* Hancock received only 5 of California's 6 electoral votes in 1880.

1888 vs. 1884

Electoral votes of the party that won in 1888: Republican Party

1892 vs. 1888

Electoral votes of the party that won in 1892: Democratic Party

* Cleveland received only 8 of California's 9 electoral votes in the 1892 election.
† Cleveland received only 5 of Michigan's 14 electoral votes in the 1892 election.
‡ Cleveland received only 1 of North Dakota's 3 electoral votes in the 1892 election.
↑ Cleveland received only 1 of Ohio's 23 electoral votes in the 1892 election.

1896 vs. 1892

Electoral votes of the party that won in 1896: Republican Party

* Harrison received 1 of California's 9 electoral votes in 1892 vs. McKinley's 8 of 9 in 1896.
† McKinley received only 12 of Kentucky's 13 electoral votes in the 1896 election.
‡ Harrison received only 9 of Michigan's 14 electoral votes in the 1892 election.
↑ Harrison received only 1 of North Dakota's 3 electoral votes in the 1892 election.
↓ Harrison received only 22 of Ohio's 23 electoral votes in the 1892 election.
# Harrison received only 3 of Oregon's 4 electoral votes in the 1892 election.

1900 vs. 1896

Electoral votes of the party that won in 1900: Republican Party

* McKinley received only 8 of California's 9 electoral votes in the 1896 election.
† McKinley received only 12 of Kentucky's 13 electoral votes in the 1896 election.

1904 vs. 1900

Electoral votes of the party that won in 1904: Republican Party

* Theodore Roosevelt received only 1 of Maryland's 8 electoral votes in the 1904 election

1908 vs. 1904

Electoral votes of the party that won in 1908: Republican Party

* Taft received 2 of 8 Maryland electors in 1908 vs. Roosevelt's 1 of 8 in 1904

1912 vs. 1908

Electoral votes of the party that won in 1912: Democratic Party

* Wilson received only 2 of California's 13 electoral votes in the 1912 election

† ''Bryan received only 6 of Maryland's 8 electoral votes in the 1908 election

1916 vs. 1912

Electoral votes of the party that won in 1916: Democratic Party

* Wilson received only 2 out of California's 13 electoral votes in the 1912 election
† Wilson received only 1 out of West Virginia's 8 electoral votes in the 1916 election

1920 vs. 1916

Electoral votes of the party that won in 1920: Republican Party

* Hughes received only 7 out of West Virginia's 8 electoral votes in the 1916 election

1924 vs. 1920

Electoral votes of the party that won in 1924: Republican Party

1928 vs. 1924

Electoral votes of the party that won in 1928: Republican Party

1932 vs. 1928

Electoral votes of the party that won in 1932: Democratic Party

1936 vs. 1932

Electoral votes of the party that won in 1936: Democratic Party

1940 vs. 1936

Electoral votes of the party that won in 1940: Democratic Party

1944 vs. 1940

Electoral votes of the party that won in 1944: Democratic Party

1948 vs. 1944

Electoral votes of the party that won in 1948: Democratic Party

* Truman received only 11 out of Tennessee's 12 electoral votes

1952 vs. 1948

Electoral votes of the party that won in 1952: Republican Party

1956 vs. 1952

Electoral votes of the party that won in 1956: Republican Party

1960 vs. 1956

Electoral votes of the party that won in 1960: Democratic Party

* Kennedy received only 5 out of Alabama's 11 electoral votes

1964 vs. 1960

Electoral votes of the party that won in 1964: Democratic Party

* Kennedy received only 5 electoral votes from Alabama in 1960 of what would have been 10 electoral votes in 1964

1968 vs. 1964

Electoral votes of the party that won in 1968: Republican Party

* Nixon received only 12 out of North Carolina's 13 electoral votes in 1968

1972 vs. 1968

Electoral votes of the party that won in 1972: Republican Party

* Nixon received only 12 out of North Carolina's 13 electoral votes in 1968

† Nixon received only 11 out of Virginia's 12 electoral votes in 1972

1976 vs. 1972

Electoral votes of the party that won in 1976: Democratic Party

1980 vs. 1976

Electoral votes of the party that won in 1980: Republican Party

* Ford received only 8 of Washington's 9 electoral votes in 1976, while 1 faithless elector voted for Reagan

1984 vs. 1980

Electoral votes of the party that won in 1984: Republican Party

1988 vs. 1984

Electoral votes of the party that won in 1988: Republican Party

1992 vs. 1988

Electoral votes of the party that won in 1992: Democratic Party

* Dukakis received only 5 of West Virginia's 6 electoral votes in 1988, while 1 faithless elector voted for his running mate Lloyd Bentsen. Due to reapportionment, West Virginia had 5 electoral votes in 1992, of which Clinton won all of them

1996 vs. 1992

Electoral votes of the party that won in 1996: Democratic Party

2000 vs. 1996

Electoral votes of the party that won in 2000: Republican Party

2004 vs. 2000

Electoral votes of the party that won in 2004: Republican Party

2008 vs. 2004

Electoral votes of the party that won in 2008: Democratic Party

* Kerry received only 9 of Minnesota's 10 electoral votes in 2004, while 1 faithless elector voted for his running mate John Edwards

** Obama received one of Nebraska's five electoral votes, for his win in Nebraska's second Congressional district

2012 vs. 2008

Electoral votes of the party that won in 2012: Democratic Party

* While Obama received 1 out of Nebraska's total electoral votes in 2008, he lost all of the state's votes in 2012

2016 vs. 2012

Electoral votes of the party that won in 2016: Republican Party

*Trump received one of Maine's four electoral votes, for his win in Maine's second Congressional district

†Trump received 36 of Texas's 38 electoral votes, while two faithless electors voted for other candidates

2020 vs. 2016

Electoral votes of the party that won in 2020: Democratic Party

*Biden received one of Nebraska's five electoral votes, for his win in Nebraska's second Congressional district

†In 2016, Clinton received 3 of Hawaii's 4 electoral votes, while 1 faithless elector voted for Bernie Sanders in 2016

††In 2016, Clinton received 8 of Washington's 12 electoral votes, while 4 faithless electors voted for other candidates in 2016

United States Electoral College